Dušan Cvetinović (Serbian Cyrillic: Душан Цветиновић; born 24 December 1988) is a Serbian professional footballer who plays as a defender for Serbian club Radnički 1923.

Career
Born in Šabac, Cvetinović made his senior debut at his hometown club Mačva in the 2006–07 season. He then joined Dinamo Vranje, immediately helping the club win promotion to the Serbian First League. Subsequently, he moved abroad and signed with Swiss club Wohlen in the 2009 winter transfer window. He also spent one season at Grasshoppers, before transferring to Vaduz in the summer of 2011.

In July 2013, Cvetinović moved to Norwegian side Haugesund. He scored 3 goals in 14 league appearances until the end of the 2013 season, as the club finished in third place. In the following campaign, he established himself as a regular member of the team's defensive line.

On 18 August 2015, Cvetinović went on a season-long loan to French club Lens, with an option for a permanent deal. He was sent off on his debut for the club in a 1–2 away loss to Dijon three days later. In total, Cvetinović appeared in 19 games for Lens during the 2015–16 season. In the summer of 2016, Cvetinović signed a permanent contract with the French side.

Career statistics

References

External links

 
 
 

Association football defenders
Sportspeople from Šabac
Expatriate footballers in France
Expatriate footballers in Liechtenstein
Expatriate footballers in Norway
Expatriate footballers in Switzerland
Expatriate footballers in Japan
Serbian expatriate footballers
Serbian expatriate sportspeople in France
Serbian expatriate sportspeople in Liechtenstein
Serbian expatriate sportspeople in Norway
Serbian expatriate sportspeople in Switzerland
Serbian expatriate sportspeople in Japan
Serbian First League players
Serbian footballers
Swiss Challenge League players
Swiss Super League players
Eliteserien players
Ligue 2 players
J1 League players
J2 League players
FK Mačva Šabac players
FK Dinamo Vranje players
FC Wohlen players
FC Vaduz players
FK Haugesund players
Grasshopper Club Zürich players
RC Lens players
Yokohama F. Marinos players
Tokushima Vortis players
1988 births
Living people